Diário is the fourth album by Portuguese fado singer Mafalda Arnauth, released in 2005 on Universal Music Portugal.

Track listing
 PARA MARIA
 AUDÁCIA
 FOI DEUS
 O QUE TINHA DE SER
 DA COR DA NOITE
 O NÓ QUE NOS ATA
 MILONGA DO CHIADO
 POR ONDE ME LEVAR O VENTO
 LA BOHÈME
 DA SOLIDÃO
 RASGO DE LUZ
 POR DENTRO DE MIM
 FADO DOS FADOS
 MEU AMOR DE ANTIGAMENTE
 IMPROVISO A QUATRO CRESCENTE MAIOR

Personnel
 Production: Mafalda Arnauth, António Pinheiro da Silva, Maria João Castanheira e João Eleutério
 Post-Production: Mafalda Arnauth, António Pinheiro da Silva, Maria João Castanheira
 Musical Direction and Arrangements: Marino de Freitas
 Executive Production: Mafaldarnauth Management
 Portuguese Guitar: Paulo Parreira
 Classical Guitars : Diogo Clemente e Ramon Maschio
 Acoustic Bass: Marino de Freitas
 Flügel: Miguel Gonçalves
 Accordion: Ricardo Dias
 Studio: O Circo a Vapor
 Design: Rui Garrido
 Photography: Pedro Cláudio
 Makeup: Antónia Rosa
 Wardrobe: Companhias

References

2005 albums
Universal Music Portugal albums
Mafalda Arnauth albums